Charles Leaming Tutt III (January 16, 1911 – November 3, 1993) was a well-known figure in the history of Colorado Springs. Born in Coronado, California, he was the eldest son of Charles L. Tutt, Jr., his granthfather Charles L. Tutt, Sr. was a notable miner. He had two brothers, William Thayer, born 1912, and Russell Thayer, born July 27, 1913, as well as a sister, Josephine Thayer Tutt, born June 1, 1919.

He studied at the Thacher School. In college, he was on the fencing team and a member of Charter. Tutt spent most of his career with General Motors in Flint, Michigan, at first with Buick, and later with the General Motors Institute, of which he became dean of engineering. In the 1940s, he spent several years on the engineering faculty of Princeton University. After retirement, he moved to Colorado Springs.

He and his father's friend, Spencer Penrose, were the co-owners of The Broadmoor hotel and resort. When Penrose died in 1939, his father Tutt became president of the resort hotel and one of four trustees of the El Pomar Foundation.

Tutt was active in the engineering profession, serving as president of the American Society of Mechanical Engineers from 1975 to 1976. He received an honorary doctorate from Norwich University, of which he was a trustee.

Tutt was active in civic affairs, and was an avid fisherman and hobbyist, making jigsaw puzzles and tying trout flies.

In 1933, Tutt married Pauline Barbara Shaffer. They had two sons, Charles (IV), and William Bullard. His first wife Barbara died in 1981. In 1982, Tutt married Mildred Dailey LeMieux. Tutt. died on November 3, 1993, in Colorado Springs. With his second wife he had two stepdaughters, Linda and Leslie LeMieux. Tutt Jr.'s brother Russell, died just one year before him on October 21, 1992, in Colorado Springs.

References 

1911 births
1993 deaths
People from Colorado Springs, Colorado
Kettering University faculty
Princeton University faculty
The Thacher School alumni